Sandrine Jauréguiberry (born October 3, 1973) is a French international rugby union player. She plays the wing position at AS Bayonne (women's), and for the France women's national rugby union team.  She competed at the 2002 Six Nations Championship, 2004 Six Nations Championship, 2006 Six Nations Championship, and 2006 Women's Rugby World Cup.

Career 
She started rugby in 1994 with friends who set up a club, AS Bayonne. She played for U.S. Bardos. She is part of the French women's rugby team, notably competing in the 2006 Women's Rugby World Cup.

She works as a special educator.

References 

1973 births
French rugby union players
French female rugby union players
Living people